This is a list of governorates of Jordan (muhafazah) by Human Development Index as of 2021.

References 

Jordan
Human Development Index
Governorates by Human Development Index
HDI